Václav Meidl (born May 27, 1986, in Havířov, Czechoslovakia) is an ice hockey forward. He is currently playing for LHK Jestřábi Prostějov of the 1st Czech Republic Hockey League. He has previously played in the Czech Extraliga for AZ Havířov, Orli Znojmo and HC Kometa Brno. He also played in the English Premier Ice Hockey League for the Manchester Phoenix, the German Oberliga for Saale Bulls Halle and the Polska Hokej Liga for Orlik Opole.

Meidl was drafted 81st overall by the Nashville Predators in the 2004 NHL Entry Draft.

Career statistics

Regular season and playoffs

International

References

External links

1986 births
AZ Havířov players
BK Havlíčkův Brod players
Czech ice hockey centres
HC Kometa Brno players
HC Olomouc players
HC Slovan Ústečtí Lvi players
LHK Jestřábi Prostějov players
Living people
Manchester Phoenix players
Orli Znojmo players
Orlik Opole players
Oshawa Generals players
People from Havířov
Saale Bulls Halle players
Plymouth Whalers players
Saginaw Spirit players
Nashville Predators draft picks
Sportspeople from the Moravian-Silesian Region
Czech expatriate ice hockey players in Canada
Czech expatriate ice hockey players in the United States
Czech expatriate ice hockey players in Germany
Czech expatriate sportspeople in England
Czech expatriate sportspeople in Poland
Expatriate ice hockey players in England
Expatriate ice hockey players in Poland